David Kenny may refer to:

 David Kenny (footballer, born 1891) (1891–1978), Scottish footballer (Grimsby Town)
 David Kenny (footballer, born 1962), Scottish footballer (Partick Thistle)
 David Kenny (journalist), Irish journalist, author and broadcaster
 David Kenny (hurler) (born 1987), Irish hurler
 David Kenny (executive), American CEO of the Weather Channel
 David A. Kenny (born 1946), American psychologist
 David Kenny (athlete), Irish racewalker